The Costello tetra is a species of characin from the Amazon basin and is found in Brazil and Peru. The specific name comes from Lake Hyanuary in Brazil. Other common names used in English are January tetra and green neon. The name "green neon" is also used for Paracheirodon simulans.

Distribution
Costello tetras are found in the Amazon Basin.

In the aquarium
Costello tetras have been kept in the aquarium hobby. Some foods aquarists feed them include flakes, pellets, and live foods.

References

External links
https://www.aqua-fish.net/fish/january-tetra

Costello Tetra Fact Sheet

Tetras
Freshwater fish of Brazil
Taxa named by Marion Durbin Ellis
Fish described in 1918